Thomas Hurst Hughes (January 10, 1769 – November 10, 1839) was a U.S. Representative from New Jersey.

Biography
Born in the Cold Spring section of Lower Township, New Jersey, on January 10, 1769; he attended the public schools. He moved to Cape May City in 1800 and engaged in the mercantile business; in 1816 he built Congress Hall, which he managed for many years; he also served as sheriff of Cape May County from 1801 to 1804. Hughes was a member of the New Jersey General Assembly from 1805 to 1807, in 1809, 1812, and 1813; and a member of the New Jersey Legislative Council (now the New Jersey Senate) from 1819 to 1823 and in 1824 and 1825.

Congress
He was elected as an Anti-Jacksonian candidate to the Twenty-first and Twenty-second Congresses, serving in office from March 4, 1829 to March 3, 1833. As he was not a candidate for renomination in 1832.

After Congress
He resumed the hotel business, dying in Cold Spring on November 10, 1839. His interment is in the Cold Spring Presbyterian Cemetery.

Sources 

1769 births
1839 deaths
People from Lower Township, New Jersey
Politicians from Cape May County, New Jersey
People of colonial New Jersey
American people of Welsh descent
Members of the New Jersey General Assembly
Members of the New Jersey Legislative Council
New Jersey sheriffs
Burials at Cold Spring Presbyterian Church
National Republican Party members of the United States House of Representatives from New Jersey